Kim Ju-young (born July 9, 1988) is a South Korean former football player.

Honours

Club 
FC Seoul
 K League 1
 Winners (1): 2012
 AFC Champions League
 Runners-up (1): 2013
 FA Cup
 Runners-up (1): 2014

International
South Korea
 EAFF East Asian Cup (1) : 2015

Individual
 K League Best XI : 2014
 AFC Champions League Dream Team : 2014

Club career statistics 
 As of 19 August 2017

External links
 
 
 
 Kim Ju-young – National Team stats at KFA 

1988 births
Living people
Association football central defenders
South Korean footballers
South Korean expatriate footballers
South Korean expatriate sportspeople in China
Gyeongnam FC players
FC Seoul players
Shanghai Port F.C. players
Hebei F.C. players
K League 1 players
Chinese Super League players
Footballers from Seoul
Yonsei University alumni
Expatriate footballers in China
2015 AFC Asian Cup players
Asian Games medalists in football
Footballers at the 2010 Asian Games
South Korea under-23 international footballers
South Korea international footballers
Asian Games bronze medalists for South Korea
Medalists at the 2010 Asian Games